Bader Yaqoot (born December 13, 1985) is a football player from the United Arab Emirates.

References

External links
 

1985 births
Living people
Emirati footballers
Association football defenders
Al Ahli Club (Dubai) players
Al-Nasr SC (Dubai) players
Ajman Club players
Masfout Club players
Emirates Club players
Footballers at the 2006 Asian Games
UAE First Division League players
UAE Pro League players
Asian Games competitors for the United Arab Emirates
United Arab Emirates international footballers